Walter Calzoni (born 8 August 2001) is an Italian racing cyclist, who currently rides for UCI ProTeam .

Major results

2019
 1st Giro della Castellania
2021
 6th GP Hungary
 8th GP Czech Republic
 10th GP Capodarco
2022
 1st  Youth rider classification, Belgrade–Banja Luka
 1st Bassano–Monte Grappa
 2nd Road race, National Under-23 Road Championships
 3rd Coppa della Pace
 5th Overall Tour of Malopolska
1st  Youth rider classification
1st Stage 1
 8th GP Vipava Valley & Crossborder Goriška
2023
 2nd Overall Tour du Rwanda
1st  Youth rider classification
 8th Per sempre Alfredo

References

External links

2001 births
Living people
Italian male cyclists
Cyclists from Brescia